Hayoti Nav (formerly: Yangihayot) is a village and jamoat in western Tajikistan. It is located in Jabbor Rasulov District in Sughd Region. The jamoat has a total population of 14,037 (2015).

References

Populated places in Sughd Region
Jamoats of Tajikistan